South Korean musician J-Hope has written 135 songs, including music for his career as a solo musician, band member, and songs for other performers. His debut mixtape Hope World (2018) charted in ten countries worldwide, debuting atop the Billboard World Albums chart and peaking at number 30 on the Billboard 200, the highest peak by a Korean soloist at the time of release. J-Hope collaborated with numerous in-house producers at his record label Big Hit Entertainment to create the mixtape and is a credited writer on all seven tracks. The mixtape's lead single "Daydream", which debuted at number one on the Billboard World Digital Song Sales chart, is a house track discussing J-Hope's struggles as a Korean idol presented in an upbeat style. J-Hope conceptualized the song as a means to discuss "the desires and wishes that every person in the world has but [he has] to hold down and cover up" due to his career path. He later released his second solo work in September 2019, a single entitled "Chicken Noodle Soup" featuring American singer Becky G. The song contains lyrics about J-Hope's background in dance, and is performed in three languages: Korean, English, and Spanish. The song peaked at number 81 on the Billboard Hot 100, marking the first time a member of BTS has appeared on the chart as a soloist.

He serves as one of the primary songwriters for the pop and hip hop boy band  BTS, of which he is a member, appearing as a credited writer on every album released by the group since their debut in 2013. On these albums he primarily works with the Big Hit production team, including company founder Bang Si-hyuk, and fellow BTS rappers RM and Suga. The trio later collaborated to release the trap diss track "Ddaeng", produced by Suga and Korean record producer Jang Yi-jeong and inspired by traditional Korean instrumentals. He has also penned music for other musical endeavors by BTS members, co-writing the song "Otsukare" for the duo Sope, comprising himself and Suga. In addition, he composed much of the melody for the 2016 ballad "Awake", performed by bandmate Jin as his first solo song. In January 2020, the Korea Music Copyright Association (KOMCA) promoted J-Hope to a full member of the organization due to the worldwide popularity of the BTS songs "Boy with Luv", "Home", and "Blood Sweat & Tears" which he co-wrote.

J-Hope's work as a writer for musicians outside of BTS has been minimal. In 2012, before his official public debut, he featured on the track "Animal" by former labelmate Jo Kwon and was part of the writing team, which included Swedish EDM producer Avicii. J-Hope also worked with South Korean music pioneer Seo Taiji to adjust portions of the track "Come Back Home", from the album Seo Taiji and Boys IV (1995), which was eventually performed by BTS at the Seo Taiji 25th Anniversary concert in August 2017.

Songs

Notes

References

J-Hope